The Ship That Died of Shame, released in the United States as PT Raiders, is a black-and-white 1955 Ealing Studios crime film directed by Basil Dearden and starring George Baker, Richard Attenborough, Roland Culver and Bill Owen.

The film is based on a story written by Nicholas Monsarrat (better known as the author of The Cruel Sea), which originally appeared in Lilliput magazine in 1952. It was later published in a collection of short stories, The Ship That Died of Shame and other stories, in 1959.

Despite being produced by Ealing Studios, the film was shot at the film studios at Wembley Park in north-west London. It was the last feature film to be made there.

Plot
The 1087 is a British Royal Navy motor gun boat that faithfully sees its crew through the worst that World War II can throw at them. After the end of the war, George Hoskins (Richard Attenborough) convinces former skipper Bill Randall (George Baker) and Birdie (Bill Owen) to buy their beloved boat and use it for some harmless, minor smuggling of black market items like wine. But they find themselves transporting ever more sinister cargoes, such as counterfeit currency and weapons. Though their craft had been utterly reliable and never let them down in wartime, things start to go wrong after the crew start accepting jobs from Major Fordyce (Roland Culver). 1087 starts to break down frequently. The crew revolt after child murderer Raines (John Chandos) is helped to escape, but later he either falls or is pushed overboard.

When Fordyce is confronted by customs officer Brewster (Bernard Lee), Brewster is shot and dies, but not before telling Birdie of the culprit. Fordyce forces the crew at gunpoint to take him to safety. Birdie is shot and, in the ensuing scuffle, Randall grabs the gun and kills Fordyce. Randall and Hoskins then fight on the bridge while 1087 runs out of control and onto rocks, sinking after Randall and Birdie scramble to safety.

Cast
Richard Attenborough as George Hoskins
George Baker as Bill Randall
Bill Owen as Birdie
Virginia McKenna as Helen Randall
Roland Culver as Major Fordyce
Bernard Lee as Customs Officer Brewster
Ralph Truman as Sir Richard
John Chandos as Raines
Harold Goodwin as Customs officer
John Longden as the Detective
Alfie Bass as Sailor on board the 1087 (uncredited)
John Boxer as Customs Man (uncredited)
Stratford Johns as Garage Worker (uncredited)
David Langton as Man in Coastal Forces Club Bar (uncredited)
Yana, as a woman singer performing "We'll Meet Again" in a room off the bar of the Coastal Forces Club

Critical reception
The New York Times wrote "the little picture...has a nice strain of sentiment running through it and becomes mildly exciting here and there"; Time Out called it "A valuable record of bewildered British masculinity in the post-war years," before dismissing it as "a pretty threadbare thriller"; but TV Guide noted that "With a highly original premise...this movie starts in an exciting fashion and seldom slows down to take on more fuel."

References

External links

1955 films
British black-and-white films
British crime drama films
1955 crime drama films
Ealing Studios films
Films directed by Basil Dearden
Films based on short fiction
Seafaring films
Films scored by William Alwyn
Films with screenplays by Basil Dearden
Films with screenplays by Michael Relph
1950s English-language films
1950s British films